"Glokenpop" (also spelt Glockenpop) is a song by Australian alternative rock band, Spiderbait and was released in January 2000 as the fourth and final single from the band's fourth studio album Grand Slam (1999). "Glokenpop" peaked at number 80 on the Australian Singles Chart.

At the ARIA Music Awards of 2000, the song was nominated for Best Pop Release, losing out to "Spinning Around" by Kylie Minogue. Janet English won the ARIA Award for Best Cover Art for the single's cover art.

The song is featured in the 2009 video game LittleBigPlanet for PlayStation Portable.

Track listing

Charts

Release history

References

1998 songs
2000 singles
ARIA Award-winning songs
Song recordings produced by Phil McKellar
Spiderbait songs
Universal Music Australia singles